Vaikuntham is a neighborhood in Sankagiri taluk, Salem district, India. Vaikuntham is located near to Salem on NH 47 (Salem to Coimbatore). There is a Toll Plaza located near Vaikuntham.

Facilities
Vaikuntham has a bank, school, telephone exchange, post office, Aavin milk booth, and Santhai (vegetable market) on every Tuesday where local farmers gather and sell their vegetables and goods.

Worshipping

Temple

Selli Amman Temple
The Selli Amman (Sellandiyamman) Temple is a well known and famous temple around in this village. Every year in the month of November, four days festival at this temple is being conducted. All native villagers across the states in India gather with their family members and enjoy the festival. Typical folk dances, bull embracing, Oyilaattam, Giant wheel, etc will be present in the temple ground for peoples amusement.

Subneighborhood

Kaali Patti privu 
Kaali Patti Privu is a sub village of Vaikuntham. Here is a  hospital, village administrative office and EB office.

Farmers weekly market
Every Tuesdays farmers conduct a one day market in vaikuntham where nearby people gather and purchase and sell the vegetables and goods.

Bank and ATM
Here  government agriculture loan bank, Canara bank are available with safety locker option. ATM facility is available at the bank.

Transportation
Vaikuntham and Kali patti pirivu have 24-hour bus transportation. Every half an hour it has bus transportation to Salem, Sankgiri, Erode, Bavani.

Educational institutions
Vaikuntham has a government higher secondary school and Amman matriculation school.

Hospital
Nearby located is a government primary clinic; Muthusamy clinic.

People and occupations
Occupations of villagers are mostly agriculture, rope making and textile. The famous food chain "Saravana Bhavan" hotel is located on the side of NH-47.

Business
The village is famous for supplying mangoes all over the place. It has mango mandis on roadside and the famous online mango seller named "Salem Mango"

References

Villages in Salem district